"Super Soaker" is a song recorded by Australian DJ vocal and producer duo Bombs Away. The song was released digitally in September 2011 and remixes followed. The song peaked at number 83 on the Australian ARIA Charts and was certified platinum in 2012.

Track listing
Digital download
 "Super Soaker" (Original Radio Edit) – 3:41 
 "Super Soaker" (Original Extended) – 5:37 

Digital download (Remixes)
 "Super Soaker" (Rocket Pimp Remix) – 4:18 
 "Super Soaker" (Mobin Master & Tate Strauss Remix) – 6:22 
 "Super Soaker" (Pelussje Liquidato Remix) – 5:01 
 "Super Soaker" (Phetsta Remix) – 4:44
 "Super Soaker" (Kronic Remix) – 4:33
 "Super Soaker" (Smile On Impact Remix) – 6:58
 "Super Soaker" (Rave Radio Remix) – 5:36 

Digital download (Hard Dance Mixes)
 "Super Soaker" (Brooklyn Bounce Remix) – 6:14
 "Super Soaker" (Mark Breeze Remix) – 4:49 
 "Super Soaker" (Brooklyn Bounce Remix Edit) – 3:48

Charts

Certification

Release history

References

2011 singles
2011 songs
Bombs Away (group) songs